The Danish Girl is a 2015 British-American biographical romantic drama film directed by Tom Hooper. It is an adaptation of the 2000 fictional novel of the same name by David Ebershoff, which was loosely based on the life of Danish painter Lili Elbe, one of the earliest recipients of gender reassignment surgery. Eddie Redmayne stars as Elbe, Alicia Vikander plays Danish painter Gerda Wegener, with Matthias Schoenaerts, and Ben Whishaw featuring in supporting roles. The film premiered at the 72nd Venice International Film Festival on 5 September 2015, where it received the Queer Lion. Focus Features initially provided the film a limited release at four theaters on 27 November 2015 before expanding to over 700 theaters in the United States and Canada on 22 January 2016. The Danish Girl grossed a worldwide box office total of over $64 million on a production budget of $15 million. Rotten Tomatoes, a review aggregator surveyed 237 reviews and judged 68 percent to be positive.

The Danish Girl gained awards and nominations in a variety of categories with particular praise for the performances of Vikander and Redmayne. The film received four nominations at the 88th Academy Awards with Vikander winning the Academy Award for Best Supporting Actress. At the 69th British Academy Film Awards, it gained five nominations including Best British Film, Best Actor for Redmayne, and Best Actress for Vikander. Both Redmayne and Vikander were nominated at the 73rd Golden Globe Awards. Vikander also received a Screen Actors Guild Award for her performance.

At the 21st Critics' Choice Awards, the film gained five nominations with Vikander winning for Best Supporting Actress. It received seven nominations at the 20th Satellite Awards including Best Director for Hooper, Best Actor for Redmayne, and Vikander won for Best Supporting Actress. She also received the Empire Award for Best Actress, and the Palm Springs International Film Festival's Rising Star Award.

Accolades

See also
 2015 in film

Notes

References

External links
 

Lists of accolades by film